Ngamaba-Mfilou (can also be written as Ngamaba-Mfilu) is a town located in the Kouilou Region of the Republic of the Congo.

Populated places in the Republic of the Congo